Coleophora retifera is a moth of the family Coleophoridae. It is found in Spain, Israel, the Palestinian Territories and Algeria.

References

retifera
Moths of Europe
Moths of Africa
Moths of the Middle East
Moths described in 1922